Kwama may refer to:
 Kwama people
 Kwama language

Language and nationality disambiguation pages